Kšyštof Lavrinovič (born 1 November 1979) is a Lithuanian professional basketball player for the BC Vytis of the National Basketball League. He plays at the power forward and center positions.

Professional career
Lavrinovič was a two-time All-EuroLeague Team selection. On 22 August 2018 Lavrinovič signed with BC Prienai of the Lithuanian Basketball League.

On 21 September 2019 he signed with the London City Royals of the British Basketball League.

On 19 January 2020 he signed with BC Vytis of the National Basketball League.

National team career
Lavrinovič has also been a member of the men's Lithuanian national basketball team. Some of the tournaments he has played at with Lithuania's senior national team include: the EuroBasket 2003, the 2004 Summer Olympics, the EuroBasket 2005, the 2006 FIBA World Championship, the EuroBasket 2007, the 2008 Summer Olympics, the EuroBasket 2009, the EuroBasket 2011, the EuroBasket 2013, and the 2014 FIBA World Cup. He helped Lithuania win the gold medal at the EuroBasket 2003, the bronze medal at the EuroBasket 2007, and the silver medal at the EuroBasket 2013.

Personal life
Lavrinovič is ethnically Polish. Lavrinovič has a twin-brother, Darjuš, whom he played with at UNICS Kazan in the Russian Superleague, as well as with on the senior men's Lithuanian national basketball team. Lavrinovič's wife is Miss Beauty of Russia 2004, Tatyana Sidorchuk.
On 18 October 1998 Kšyštof Lavrinovič, his twin-brother Darjuš and their cousin raped at that time a seventeen year old girl. On 25 June 1999 the court sentenced the twin brothers for 5 years in prison and the cousin for 6 years in prison.

Awards and accomplishments

Professional career
 2× All-EuroLeague Second Team: (2008, 2011)
 Italian Cup MVP: (2011)
 Italian SuperCup MVP: (2011)

Lithuanian senior national team
 EuroBasket 2003: 
 EuroBasket 2007: 
 EuroBasket 2013:

EuroLeague career statistics

|-
| style="text-align:left;"|2007–08
| style="text-align:left;"|Montepaschi
| 22 || 2 || 20.6 || .609 || style="background:#CFECEC;"|.579 || .687 || 4.2 || .5 || 1.5 || 1.1 || 12.7 || 15.5
|-
| style="text-align:left;"|2008–09
| style="text-align:left;"|Montepaschi
| 17 || 1 || 24.3 || .463 || .340 || .837 || 6.4 || .8 || 1.6 || .8 || 10.8 || 14.9
|-
| style="text-align:left;"|2009–10
| style="text-align:left;"|Montepaschi
| 12 || 1 || 22.1 || .455 || .371 || .764 || 4.3 || 1.1 || 1.3 || .5 || 13.2 || 16.3
|-
| style="text-align:left;"|2010–11
| style="text-align:left;"|Montepaschi
| 21 || 5 || 24.7 || .458 || .323 || .753 || 5.0 || 1.2 || .8 || .3 || 11.8 || 13.3
|-
| style="text-align:left;"|2011–12
| style="text-align:left;"|Montepaschi
| 15 || 1 || 19.5 || .441 || .444 || .714 || 3.9 || 1.1 || .7 || .4 || 9.7 || 10.9
|-
| style="text-align:left;"|2012–13
| style="text-align:left;"|Žalgiris
| 24 || 9 || 21.3 || .493 || .365 || .825 || 4.0 || 1.0 || .5 || .3 || 8.5 || 10.3
|-
| style="text-align:left;"|2013–14
| style="text-align:left;"|Žalgiris
| 13 || 0 || 17.6 || .390 || .231 || .875 || 3.4 || 1.0 || .4 || .4 || 7.2 || 7.7
|- class="sortbottom"
| style="text-align:left;" colspan="2"|Career
| 124 || 19 || 21.6 || .482 || .389 || .766 || 4.5 || .9 || .9 || .6 || 10.6 || 12.8

References

External links
 Euroleague.net Profile
 Italian League Profile 

1979 births
Living people
2006 FIBA World Championship players
2014 FIBA Basketball World Cup players
Basketball players at the 2004 Summer Olympics
Basketball players at the 2008 Summer Olympics
BC Dynamo Moscow players
BC Lietkabelis players
BC Rytas players
BC UNICS players
BC Žalgiris players
Centers (basketball)
FIBA EuroBasket-winning players
Liga ACB players
Lithuanian expatriate basketball people in Italy
Lithuanian expatriate basketball people in Spain
Lithuanian expatriate basketball people in Russia
Lithuanian men's basketball players
Lithuanian people of Polish descent
Mens Sana Basket players
Olympic basketball players of Lithuania
Pallacanestro Reggiana players
PBC Ural Great players
Power forwards (basketball)
Basketball players from Vilnius
Lithuanian twins
Twin sportspeople
Valencia Basket players